Yevhen Olehovych Konoplyanka (born 29 September 1989) is a Ukrainian professional footballer who plays as a winger for Ekstraklasa club Cracovia and the Ukraine national team.

He began his professional career at Dnipro Dnipropetrovsk, where he made his debut in 2007 and featured in 211 matches across all competitions, scoring 45 goals and helping them to the 2015 UEFA Europa League Final. He then moved to the team who won that match, Sevilla, on a free transfer, and won the Europa League in his only season in Spain before joining Schalke 04, initially on loan.

A full international since 2010, Konoplyanka has earned over 80 caps for Ukraine, and scored 21 international goals. He played for Ukraine in Euro 2012 and Euro 2016, and is a three-time Ukrainian Footballer of the Year.

Club career
At age seven, Konoplyanka signed up for a karate class, which he did simultaneously with football, eventually reaching black belt. He is a product of the youth system of Olimpik Kirovohrad, and coach Yuriy Kevlych. He also participated in the Ukrainian National Youth Competition, representing DYuSSh-2 Kirovohrad.

Dnipro Dnipropetrovsk
Konoplyanka was signed as a youth by Dnipro Dnipropetrovsk at age 16. In the winter of 2006, he was promoted to the reserves with a starting salary of $300.

Konoplaynka's senior team debut came in a Ukrainian Premier League match on 26 August 2007 in a home game against Zakarpattia Uzhhorod which ended 0–0. Konoplyanka came on during the 83rd minute, replacing Jaba Kankava.

His first goal in the Ukrainian Premier League came 28 February 2010 in a home game against Zorya Luhansk which ended 2–2. In the second half of the 2009–10 season, Konoplyanka started and played the full 90 minutes in all of the remaining games.

In March 2011, Dynamo Kyiv interim coach Oleh Luzhnyi expressed his desire to see Konoplyanka in his ranks and the media reported that Dynamo would make an offer to Dnipro worth €14 million. In response, Dnipro coach Juande Ramos placed a sensational scare price-tag ranging from €50–€60 million, commenting that "in order to build a great team, great players should play there."

In January 2014, Konoplyanka nearly moved to English team Liverpool for £16 million, his buyout clause, but Dnipro president Ihor Kolomoyskyi refused to sanction the transfer.

Konoplyanka was a major catalyst in Dnipro's successful 2014–15 season where he helped them to a 3rd place in the domestic league and a place in the Europa League final. He was named in the competition's squad of the season.

Sevilla

On 2 July 2015, Sevilla announced that Konoplyanka was undergoing a medical. A week later, the Spanish club confirmed that he had joined on a free transfer, and signed a four-year deal, with a reported release clause of €40 million.

On 11 August, he made his competitive debut for Sevilla in the 2015 UEFA Super Cup against Barcelona, as a 68th-minute substitute for captain José Antonio Reyes. He scored an 81st-minute equaliser as Sevilla came from behind to draw 4–4, but they lost 5–4 after extra time. Ten days later, he made his La Liga debut in a goalless draw at Málaga, again as a 65th-minute substitute for Reyes, and on 16 September, he scored on his UEFA Champions League debut, concluding a 3–0 group stage win over Borussia Mönchengladbach at the Estadio Ramon Sánchez Pizjuán with his first touch of the game. Ten days later, after coming off the bench against Rayo Vallecano, he attained his first league goal for the Andalusians, winning the match 3–2 with a late free kick for a first victory of the season.

At the end of the calendar year, Konoplyanka was one of the shortlisted nominees for UEFA Team of the Year. He was an unused substitute in the 2016 UEFA Europa League Final, where Sevilla beat Liverpool 3–1 in Basel to claim their fifth trophy. He played seven matches in their Copa del Rey campaign, scoring a late equaliser as a substitute in a 2–2 draw at Celta Vigo in the semi-finals (6–2 aggregate), and also came off the bench in the final where they lost 2–0 to Barcelona after extra time. On 9 August, he scored a penalty in the 2016 UEFA Super Cup against Real Madrid, an eventual 3–2 loss following extra time in Trondheim.

Schalke 04
On 30 August 2016, Konoplyanka was loaned to Schalke 04 with an obligatory buyout clause at the end of the campaign for €12.5 million. He made his debut on 9 September in a 2–0 home loss to reigning Bundesliga champions Bayern Munich, and scored his first goal on 20 October, the game's only in an away Europa League group game at Krasnodar. Six days later, he struck twice in the first half of a 3–2 win at 1. FC Nürnberg in the second round of the DFB-Pokal. In a mid-table season, his only goal of 17 league games was scored on 17 December to equalise in a 1–1 draw with SC Freiburg at the Veltins-Arena.

Shakhtar Donetsk
On 2 September 2019, Konoplyanka signed a three-year deal with Shakhtar Donetsk.

Cracovia
After becoming a free agent, Konoplyanka signed a half-year contract, with an extension option, with Ekstraklasa club Cracovia on 11 February 2022.

International career

In April 2010, Konoplyanka was first called up to Ukraine's senior national team by head coach Myron Markevych. He made his international debut on 25 May, playing the entirety of a 4–0 friendly win over Lithuania in Kharkiv. Four days later at Arena Lviv, he scored the equaliser as Ukraine came from behind to defeat Romania 3–2 in another friendly. Participated in the final match of Cyprus International Football Tournaments in 2011, when Ukraine won Sweden.

In the Euro 2012 tournament Konoplyanka started in all three of Ukraine's matches as the co-hosts exited in the group stage. In their opening game at the Olympic Stadium in Kyiv, he assisted Andriy Shevchenko's winning goal with a corner for a 2–1 victory against Sweden.

On 11 September 2012, Konoplyanka scored a long-range goal in a 1–1 draw against England at Wembley Stadium in a 2014 FIFA World Cup qualifier. The BBC said of his performance: "the tremendous Yevhen Konoplyanka delivered a masterful performance to dictate in midfield". He scored two more goals in Ukraine's qualifying campaign, in victories over San Marino and Montenegro, but the team lost to France in a play-off for the tournament.

Konoplyanka scored twice in 11 matches as Ukraine qualified for Euro 2016, their first successful qualification campaign. He captained the team for their 3–1 aggregate win over Slovenia in the play-off in November 2015.

He was included in Ukraine's squad for Euro 2016 in France, where Ukraine failed to score and finished bottom of the group.

Career statistics

Club

International

International goals
As of match played 7 June 2019. Ukraine score listed first, score column indicates score after each Konoplyanka goal.

Honours
Sevilla
UEFA Europa League: 2015–16

Shakhtar
Ukrainian Premier League: 2019–20

Individual
Ukrainian Footballer of the Year: 2010, 2012, 2013 (jointly shared with Andriy Yarmolenko)
Ukrainian Premier League Best Player: 2011–12, 2013–14
UEFA Europa League Squad of the Season: 2014–15

References

External links

 
 

1989 births
Living people
Sportspeople from Kropyvnytskyi
Association football wingers
Ukrainian footballers
Ukraine international footballers
Ukraine youth international footballers
Ukraine under-21 international footballers
UEFA Euro 2012 players
Ukrainian Premier League players
La Liga players
Bundesliga players
Ekstraklasa players
FC Dnipro players
Sevilla FC players
FC Schalke 04 players
FC Shakhtar Donetsk players
MKS Cracovia (football) players
Ukrainian expatriate footballers
Expatriate footballers in Spain
Ukrainian expatriate sportspeople in Spain
UEFA Euro 2016 players
Expatriate footballers in Germany
Ukrainian expatriate sportspeople in Germany
Expatriate footballers in Poland
Ukrainian expatriate sportspeople in Poland
UEFA Europa League winning players